Percy Erskine Nobbs  (August 11, 1875 – November 5, 1964)  was a Canadian architect who was born in Haddington, East Lothian, and trained in the United Kingdom. Educated at the Edinburgh Collegiate School and Edinburgh University, he spent most of his career in the Montreal area. Often working in partnership with George Taylor Hyde, Nobbs designed a great many of what would become Montreal's heritage buildings and was a key Canadian proponent of the Arts and Crafts Movement in architecture. He served as the director of McGill University's School of Architecture for ten years and designed many buildings on the campus as well as McGill's Coat of Arms, which continues to be used today.

Architecture career
He designed the fire station on Euston Road, in the "Arts and Crafts" style. It was built in 1901-2 and still stands. Nobbs had already received awards and won prizes as a practicing architect when he came to McGill University in 1903 to teach architecture.  He got permission to practice architecture while teaching and soon obtained commissions for private homes as well as for institutional buildings.  His designs for homes had the distinction of paying a great deal of attention to the siting and orientation of the building and the placement of the windows.  He considered this at least as important as what the home actually looked like.  He called it "building for Prospect as well as Aspect," and designed many an impressive mansion in this way. The magnitude of such mansions can be grasped by studying through his various plans and blueprints, such as the house of the Quebec Alpha of the Phi Delta Theta fraternity, in Montreal. The initial plans divided the house across 4 floors, 11 bedrooms, a library, and 2 servants' rooms. These documents are currently kept in the Canadian Architecture Collection of the McGill University Archives.

In partnership with Cecil Burgess, Percy Erskine Nobbs designed the J.B. Porter House on McTavish Street, Montreal,
which has been demolished. In 1906-1907 Nobbs was in a temporary partnership with David Robertson Brown.

Projects

Nobbs designed the interior decorative program of the Currie Hall at the Royal Military College of Canada in Kingston, Ontario. The Currie Building decorations evoke the achievements of the Canadian Corps in the Great War, and with the British Monarchy.

Nobbs and Hyde designed many McGill University buildings: Power House (1909); Strathcona Medical Building (1923); Pathology Building (1923); Pulp & Paper Research Institute (1927). Nobbs and Hyde remodeled many McGill University buildings: MacDonald Engineering Building, reconstruction after a fire in 1907; a major addition to the University Library, McTavish Street (1921–22); addition of West Wing at Royal Victoria College (1930–31). Nobbs and Hyde provided interiors and furniture for the Osler Memorial Library (1923). Many of his drawings for McGill University buildings can be found in his archive, held in the Canadian Architecture Collection at McGill University.

Nobbs and Hyde designed some commercial buildings around Montreal as well as the University Club building (1913) on Mansfield Street.

Nobbs and Frank Darling designed the master plan for the University of Alberta in 1909–1910. With Cecil S. Burgess, Nobbs designed the Provincial College of Medicine (1920–21). Nobbs designed the Arts Building (1914–15); laboratories and Power House (1914);

Nobbs and Hyde won the competition for the war memorial in Regina.

He designed the University Club building in Montreal, associated with McGill University, which was completed in 1913 and was eventually registered as a monument historique of Quebec. He also designed the McGill University Coat of Arms, three years into his directorship at the McGill School of Architecture, which continues to be used by the university today.

He was an accomplished athlete in fencing, representing Canada at the 1908 Olympics and for all of his life he was a true fisherman and founded the Atlantic Salmon Federation due to his love of fishing. He published two books, now both out of print, entitled Fencing Tactics and Salmon Tactics. His talent as a draftsman and painter—he was an RCA—was also quite exceptional.

Honours
He was elected an Academician of the Royal Canadian Academy of Arts in 1920, and in 1924 became President of the Québec Association of Architects. In 1928 he was named President of the Town Planning Institute of Canada, and in 1929 he was elected to the Royal Society of Arts and also became President of the Royal Architectural Institute in Canada.

References

Further reading

External links
Historic Places in Canada
History Writ Large: The Architecture of Percy Erskine Nobbs (John Bland Canadian Architecture Collection)  
Percy Erskine Nobbs Fonds Canadian Architecture Collection, McGill University Library & Archives.
The Canadian Encyclopedia

1875 births
1964 deaths
19th-century Scottish architects
Architects from Montreal
Canadian male fencers
Academic staff of McGill University
Fencers from Montreal
Anglophone Quebec people
Canadian people of Scottish descent
Members of the Royal Canadian Academy of Arts
Olympic fencers of Canada
Fencers at the 1908 Summer Olympics
People from Haddington, East Lothian
Arts and Crafts architects
Persons of National Historic Significance (Canada)
Alumni of the University of Edinburgh
People educated at Edinburgh Collegiate School